Dongming County in Heze Prefecture is the westernmost county of Shandong Province in the People's Republic of China. It borders Henan Province to the west across the Yellow River. Dongming County had a population of 677,563 in 1999.

History
Most of Dongming County formerly formed part of Yuanqu County, which was abolished in the 12th century after a Yellow River flood destroyed its county seat. In the early 20th century, the county was part of Zhili. Later, the area came under the jurisdiction of Henan. From April 1963, the county became part of Shandong. Within Yuanqu County, the town of Zhuzao ( Zhǔzǎochéng) was located within present-day Dongming County.

Administrative divisions
Dongming County includes seven towns, six townships, one provincial economic and technical development zone, and 389 administrative villages.
Towns

Townships

Demographics
The population in 1999 was 677,563.

Climate

References

External links
 Official site 

 
Counties of Shandong
Heze